The Battle of Beersheba may refer to:

 Battle of Beersheba (1917), a part of the Sinai Campaign in World War I
 Battle of Beersheba (1948), a part of Operation Yoav in the 1948 Arab–Israeli War